NetVista is an umbrella name for a variety of products manufactured by IBM.

Software suite
The Software Suite was introduced in April 1996 as a client–server software suite, with the server software running on OS/2, and the client software on Windows 3.1 and Windows 95. Meant to provide Internet access to K-12 users, it included such things as a web browser, nanny software and other internet utilities, including a TCP/IP stack.

Starting with version 1.1, the server side was also supported on Windows NT. The software suite was withdrawn without replacement in January 2000.

Products:
 NetVista V1.0
 NetVista V1.1
 NetVista V2.0

Network station
In April 2000, the IBM Network Station product line was renamed to IBM NetVista, as were the associated software tools. The NetVista computers were thin client systems. The line was withdrawn in April 2002 with no replacement.

Hardware products:
 NetVista N2200 (Cyrix MediaGX at 233 MHz, 32-288 MB RAM, CompactFlash, Ethernet, USB 1.1, VGA, Audio I/O)
 NetVista N2200e
 NetVista N2200l
 NetVista N2200w
 NetVista N2800
 NetVista N2800e
 NetVista N70

Software products:
 NetVista Thin Client Manager V2R1

Kiosk
Hardware products:
 NetVista Kiosk Model 120
 NetVista Kiosk Model 150

Appliance
This appliance is meant to allow internet access on a TV. It was not sold directly to end-users, but offered as an OEM product to internet providers.

Hardware products:
 NetVista Internet Appliance i30

Personal computer

The IBM NetVista personal computer was the follow-on to the IBM PC Series. It was announced in May 2000, and withdrawn in May 2004. It was replaced by the IBM ThinkCentre (now Lenovo ThinkCentre since 2005). Initially offered in the typical white/beige cases of the 1990s the NetVista was sold in black later on.

Products:
 A Series
 IBM NetVista A10
 IBM NetVista A20 (Pentium III)
 IBM NetVista A20i (Pentium III)
 IBM NetVista A21 (Celeron)
 IBM NetVista A21i (Pentium III)
 IBM NetVista A22 (Celeron)
 IBM NetVista A22p (Pentium 4)
 IBM NetVista A30 (Pentium 4)
 IBM NetVista A30p (Pentium 4)
 IBM NetVista A40 (Pentium III)
 IBM NetVista A40i (AMD Athlon)
 IBM NetVista A40p (Pentium III)
 IBM NetVista A60 (Pentium 4)
 IBM NetVista A60i (Pentium 4)
 M Series (Manageability)
 IBM NetVista M41
 IBM NetVista M42
 S Series
 IBM NetVista S40
 IBM NetVista S40p
 IBM NetVista S42
 X Series (all-in-one)
 IBM NetVista X40
 IBM NetVista X40i
 IBM NetVista X41 - designed by Richard Sapper

See also 

 IBM PC Series
 IBM Aptiva
 IBM/Lenovo ThinkCentre

References

External links
 NetVista Personal Systems Reference Guide 

NetVista
NetVista
NetVista
Computer-related introductions in 2000
Business desktop computers